USS Eugene (PF-40), a , originally classified as PG-148, is the only ship of the United States Navy to be named for Eugene, Oregon.

Service history
Eugene (PF-40) was launched at the Consolidated Steel Corporation shipyard in Wilmington, Los Angeles, on 6 July 1943, sponsored by Mrs. Frank D. Cross; and commissioned on 15 January 1944.

Following her shakedown cruise, Eugene, who was manned by a Coast Guard crew, stood out of San Francisco, California, en route to the southwestern Pacific.

Arriving off the coast of Australia in late June 1944, she engaged in anti-submarine patrol off New Guinea and the Philippines, transported personnel, bombarded the shore at Soepiori Island, but principally escorted convoys among the islands of the area.

In December 1944, she returned to the United States for overhaul.  She returned briefly to convoy duty until 25 May 1945, when she was converted to a weather ship, and performed this duty until arriving at Charleston, South Carolina, for decommissioning on 12 June 1946.  Eugene was stricken from the Navy List on 19 July 1946.

Eugene was transferred to Cuba in 1947 and renamed José Martí (F 301). She was scrapped in 1976.

Awards
Eugene received two battle stars for World War II service.

References

External links 
 
hazegray.org: USS Eugene

Tacoma-class frigates
Ships built in Los Angeles
1943 ships
World War II frigates and destroyer escorts of the United States
Tacoma-class frigates of the Cuban Navy
Weather ships